Gerald Madkins Jr. (born April 18, 1969) is an American professional basketball executive who is a former assistant general manager for the New York Knicks  of the National Basketball Association (NBA). He is a former professional basketball player.

Born in Merced, California, Madkins attended University of California, Los Angeles (UCLA). He signed with the Cleveland Cavaliers of the NBA and played with them from 1993 to 1994, and was signed by the Miami Heat on January 21, 1998. Madkins played briefly with the Golden State Warriors in 1998. He also played in the Continental Basketball Association (CBA) for the Grand Rapids Hoops and Rockford Lightning. He was named CBA Rookie of the Year with the Hoops in 1993 and selected to the All-CBA First Team with the Lightning in 1998. He also played overseas in Spain and France.

After his retirement from basketball, he acted as an assistant coach for California State University, Stanislaus, and for his alma mater, the UCLA Bruins, In 2003 was named a player scout for the New York Knicks. During the 2007-08 season he served as Director of West Coast College Scouting for the Seattle SuperSonics. On September 10, 2008, Madkins was named Director of Scouting by the Houston Rockets. In 2010, he joined the New Orleans Hornets as their Vice President of Player Personnel.

On September 24, 2012, Madkins was hired by the Los Angeles Clippers as their director of basketball operations, reporting to vice president of basketball operations Gary Sacks. In June 2014, Clippers coach Doc Rivers was promoted from senior vice president to president of basketball operations, and Madkins was named Director of Scouting as part of Rivers' restructuring. He was promoted to assistant general manager prior to the start of the 2015-16 season.

Notes

External links

 Profile & photo @ cavshistory.com
 

1969 births
Living people
African-American basketball players
American expatriate basketball people in France
American expatriate basketball people in Spain
American men's basketball coaches
American men's basketball players
Basketball coaches from California
Basketball players from California
Cholet Basket players
Cleveland Cavaliers players
Golden State Warriors players
Grand Rapids Hoops players
Grand Rapids Mackers players
Joventut Badalona players
Liga ACB players
Los Angeles Clippers executives
New Orleans Hornets executives
People from Merced, California
Seattle SuperSonics executives
Shooting guards
Stanislaus State Warriors men's basketball coaches
UCLA Bruins men's basketball coaches
UCLA Bruins men's basketball players
Undrafted National Basketball Association players
21st-century African-American people
20th-century African-American sportspeople